Phymatodes lengi is a species of beetle in the family Cerambycidae.

References

Phymatodes
Beetles described in 1911